Drive My Car may refer to

"Drive My Car" (song), 1965 song by The Beatles
Drive My Car (film), 2021 Japanese drama-road film
"Drive My Car" (short story), from the Men Without Women collection by Haruki Murakami